Keetmanshoop is a city in the ǁKaras Region of southern Namibia, lying on the Trans-Namib Railway from Windhoek to Upington in South Africa. It is named after Johann Keetman, a German industrialist and benefactor of the city.

History 

Before the colonial era, the settlement was known as ǂNuǂgoaes or Swartmodder, both of which mean "Black Marsh" and indicated the presence of a spring in the area. The first white settler, Guilliam Visagie, arrived here in 1785. When in February 1850 the Kharoǃoan clan (Keetmanshoop Nama) split from the Red Nation, the main subtribe of the Nama people, they settled permanently here. In 1860 the Rhenish Missionary Society founded a mission there to christianise the local Nama. The first missionary, Johann Georg Schröder, arrived in Keetmanshoop on April 14, 1866, which is now marked as the founding date of Keetmanshoop. The mission station was named after the German trader and director of the Rhenish Missionary Society, who supported the mission financially. He never actually visited the place himself.

Notable buildings and structures

The Rhenish Missionary Church was erected in 1895, it now also contains a museum. It was declared a historic monument in 1978 and is a well-known landmark. Its unique combination of Gothic architecture cast in African stone makes it one of the architectural masterpieces in the country and a popular tourist attraction. Other notable buildings are the Schützenhaus (marksmen's club house, 1905–07), the railway station building (1908) and the Imperial Post Office (now the Keetmanshoop tourist information, erected in 1910).

The town is situated near two quiver tree forests, one of them being a national monument and a major tourist attraction of Namibia. Also close to Keetmanshoop is the Naute Dam.

J. Stephanus Stadium is located in Keetmanshoop and is home to Fedics United F.C., a football team in the Namibia Premier League.

Keetmanshoop is also an important center of the Karakul sheep farming community.

Politics
Keetmanshoop is governed by a municipality council that  has seven seats.

In the 2010 local authority election, a total of 3,156 votes were cast in the city. SWAPO won with approximately 48% of the vote. Of the three other parties seeking votes in the election, Rally for Democracy and Progress (RDP) received approximately 35% of the vote, followed by the Democratic Party of Namibia (DPN, 10%) and the Democratic Turnhalle Alliance (DTA, 7%).

The 2015 local authority election was won by SWAPO by a much larger margin. SWAPO accumulated 2,337 votes and won five seats in the municipal council. DTA (538 votes) and RDP (186 votes) gained one seat each.

The 2020 Namibian local authority election was won by LPM. LPM accumulated 3,619 votes and won five seats in the municipal council. SWAPO (1648 votes) gained two seats.

Geography

Climate 
Keetmanshoop has a hot desert climate (Köppen climate classification BWh), with long, very hot summers and cold winters. The annual average rainfall is only . Keetmanshoop is one of the sunniest places year-round on the planet with a mean sunshine duration over 3,870 hours yearly or 10.7 sunny hours daily or well above 87% of the time. The annual mean temperature is 21.1 °C (70.0 °F) with a mean annual high of 28.8 °C (83.8 °F) and a low of 13.3 °C (55.9 °F). The climate is characterized by sunshine and dryness as well as moderate heat all year long.

References

External links

 
Cities in Namibia
Populated places in the ǁKaras Region
Populated places founded by Afrikaners
Regional capitals in Namibia
1866 establishments in South West Africa
Populated places established in 1866